Pociūnai Airfield , also known as  Prienai Airfield, is a recreational aerodrome located in Ašminta elderate of Kaunas district municipality, Lithuania; 38 km south of the Kaunas centre. The airport's infrastructure allows it to handle medium and small sized aircraft, up to the size of the Saab 2000, Saab 340.

Civil Aviation Organizations
Kaunas Skydiving Club
AB Sportinė aviacija
UAB Termikas
Kaunas Gliding Club (KGC).

Civil Aviation Clubs 

Pociūnai Airfield is home base of Kaunas Gliding Club.

Aeroplane sports department of KGC separated and became an independent aeroplane sports club which was located in Pociūnai as well in 1975. Kaunas ASK started organizing Gliding championships of USSR, international gliding competitions. Pociūnai became the centre of Lithuanian gliding.

External links 
 Pociūnai Airfield website
 Pociūnai Airport photo gallery
 EU funds spur Baltic hopes. Flight International, 12/04/2005

Airports in Lithuania
Buildings and structures in Alytus County